Partula guamensis is a species of air-breathing tropical land snail, a terrestrial pulmonate gastropod mollusk in the family Partulidae.

Distribution
This species is endemic to the island of Pohnpei (Federated States of Micronesia).

References

 Gerlach J. (2016). Icons of evolution: Pacific Island tree-snails of the family Partulidae. Phelsuma Press. 

Fauna of Micronesia
Partula (gastropod)
Taxonomy articles created by Polbot
Gastropods described in 1846